1900 was the 11th season of County Championship cricket in England. Yorkshire finished the season unbeaten to take the championship title and were the first unbeaten champions since the official competition began in 1890. Defending champions Surrey finished seventh. Lancashire were second, and the matches between the two top teams both ended in draws; Yorkshire made 230 in the first innings of the first game, compared to Lancashire's 96, but still could not force a victory, and in the second, with a crowd of over 44,000 present over three days at Old Trafford, Yorkshire took a lead of seven runs on first innings, but as only two and a half hours of play had been possible on the second day, the game was drawn. Sussex, who finished third with 18 of 24 matches drawn, enjoyed 2,000 runs from Ranjitsinhji for the second season running, as he bettered the record for most runs in a Championship season to 2,563. There were no international matches during this season.

Honours
County Championship – Yorkshire
Minor Counties Championship – Durham, Glamorgan, Northamptonshire (shared title)
Wisden Cricketers of the Year (Mr R E Foster and Four Yorkshiremen) – Tip Foster, Schofield Haigh, George Hirst, Tom Taylor, John Tunnicliffe

County Championship

Final table 
The final County Championship table is shown below. One point was awarded for a win, none for a draw, and minus one for a loss. Positions were decided on percentage of points over completed games.

 1 Games completed

Points system:

 1 for a win
 0 for a draw, a tie or an abandoned match
 -1 for a loss

Most runs in the County Championship

Most wickets in the County Championship

Overall first-class statistics

Leading batsmen

Leading bowlers

References

Annual reviews
 Wisden Cricketers' Almanack 1901

External links
 Cricket in England in 1900

1900 in English cricket
1900